Yunjin Road is a station on Line 11 of the Shanghai Metro, which opened on August31, 2013.

References

Railway stations in Shanghai
Line 11, Shanghai Metro
Shanghai Metro stations in Xuhui District
Railway stations in China opened in 2013